Moriuchi (written: 森内 lit. "forest inside") is a Japanese surname. Notable people with the surname include:

, Japanese singer-songwriter
, Japanese singer-songwriter and composer
, Japanese writer
, Japanese baseball player
, Japanese shogi, chess and backgammon player

Japanese-language surnames